is a Japanese word for foreigners and non-Japanese citizens in Japan, specifically being applied to foreigners of non-Japanese ethnicity and those from the Japanese diaspora who are not Japanese citizens. The word is typically used to refer to foreigners of non-East Asian ethnicities.

Some feel the word has come to have a negative or pejorative connotation, while other observers maintain it is neutral.  is a more neutral and somewhat more formal term widely used in the Japanese government and in media. Gaijin does not specifically mean a foreigner that is also a white person; instead, the term hakujin (白人, "white person") can be considered as a type of foreigner, and kokujin (黒人, "black person") would be the black equivalent.

Etymology and history
The word gaijin can be traced in writing to the 13th-century Heike Monogatari:

Here, gaijin refers to outsiders and potential enemies. Another early reference is in Renri Hishō by Nijō Yoshimoto, where it is used to refer to a Japanese person who is a stranger, not a friend. The Noh play, Kurama tengu has a scene where a servant objects to the appearance of a traveling monk:

Here, gaijin also means an outsider or unfamiliar person.

The Portuguese in the 16th century were the first Europeans to visit Japan; they were called nanbanjin ("southern barbarians"), and trade with them was known as the Nanban trade.  When British and Dutch adventurers such as William Adams arrived in the early 17th century, they were usually known as kōmōjin ("red-haired people"), a term cognate to one used in modern Hokkien Chinese.

When the Tokugawa shogunate was made to open Japan to foreign contact after two centuries of self-isolation, Westerners were commonly called as ijin ("different people"), a shortened form of ikokujin ("different country person") or ihōjin ("different motherland people").

The word gaikokujin is composed of gaikoku (foreign country) and jin (person). Early citations exist from c. 1235, but it was largely non-extant until reappearing in 1838. The Meiji government (1868–1912) further popularized the term, which came to replace ijin, ikokujin and ihōjin. As the Empire of Japan extended to Korea and to Taiwan, the term naikokujin ("inside country people") came to refer to nationals of other imperial territories. While other terms fell out of use after World War II, gaikokujin remained the official term for non-Japanese people. Some hold that the modern gaijin is a contraction of gaikokujin.

Usage

While all forms of the word mean "foreigner" or "outsider", in practice gaijin or gaikokujin are commonly used to refer to foreigners of non-East Asian ethnicities. For example, other East Asians such as ethnic Chinese and Koreans residing in Japan are not referred to as gaijin, but by their nationality directly, such as 星嘉波人 for Singapore or 印度尼西亜人 for Indonesia, however katakana versions are now more widely used ever since the end of World War II. Zainichi (在日), or for ethnic Chinese specifically, kakyō (華僑), are also used.

The term may also sometimes be applied to Wajin born and raised in other countries. Gaijin is also commonly used within Japanese events such as baseball (there is a limit to non-Japanese players in NPB) and professional wrestling to collectively refer to the visiting performers from the West who will frequently tour the country.

Japanese speakers commonly refer to non-Japanese people as gaijin even while they are overseas. Also, people of Japanese descent native to other countries (especially those countries with large Japanese communities) might also call non-descendants gaijin, as a counterpart to nikkei. This interpretation of the term as neutral in tone continues for some. However, though the term may be used without negative intent by many Japanese speakers, it is seen as derogatory by some and reflective of exclusionary attitudes.

In light of these connotations, the more neutral and formal gaikokujin is often used as an alternative term to refer to non-Japanese people. Nanette Gottlieb, Professor of Japanese Studies at the School of Languages and Comparative Cultural Studies at the University of Queensland, suggests that the term has become controversial and is avoided now by most Japanese television broadcasters.

Gaijin appears frequently in Western literature and pop culture. It forms the title of such novels as Marc Olden's Gaijin (New York: Arbor House, 1986), James Melville's Go gently, gaijin (New York : St. Martin's Press, 1986), James Kirkup's Gaijin on the Ginza (London: Chester Springs, 1991) and James Clavell's Gai-Jin (New York: Delacorte Press, 1993), as well as a song by Nick Lowe. It is the title of feature films such as Tizuka Yamazaki's Gaijin – Os Caminhos da Liberdade (1980) and Gaijin – Ama-me Como Sou (2005), as well as animation shorts such as Fumi Inoue's Gaijin (2003).

Foreign residents in Japan

See also

 List of terms for ethnic exogroups
 Alien (law)
 Bule
 Farang
 Guizi
 Goyim
 Gweilo
 Gringo
 Japanese abbreviated and contracted words
 Laowai
 Pendatang
 Sangokujin
 Sonnō jōi

Notes

References

Japanese words and phrases
Ethno-cultural designations
Racism in Japan
Pejorative terms for in-group non-members
Xenophobia in Asia